Howett may refer to:

People
John Howett (b. ? ), British automobile sales, manufacturing, and racing executive
Mark Howett (b. 1963), Australian theatre, film, and opera director, designer, and lighting designer
Roberta Howett (b. 1981), Irish singer

Ships
USS Howett (PF-84), a United States Navy patrol frigate transferred to the United Kingdom while under construction which served in the Royal Navy as the frigate  from 1944 to 1945